Cho Hyang-mi (born 15 April 1973) is a South Korean taekwondo practitioner. 

She won a gold medal in welterweight at the 1995 World Taekwondo Championships, and another gold medal at the 1997 World Taekwondo Championships. She won a gold medal at the 1998 Asian Games, and a gold medal in lightweight at the 1999 World Taekwondo Championships in Edmonton.

References

External links

1973 births
Living people
South Korean female taekwondo practitioners
Taekwondo practitioners at the 1998 Asian Games
Asian Games medalists in taekwondo
Medalists at the 1998 Asian Games
Asian Games gold medalists for South Korea
World Taekwondo Championships medalists
20th-century South Korean women